María Catalina Pulido Anker (born 14 September 1974) is a Chilean actress, model, and television presenter.

Career 
In 1993, she debuted in the video clip of the song "Fe" by Jorge González. Her outrageous look, red haired, 1.76m (5 ft 9 in) height, and her particular facial features, made her stand out in the Chilean modeling business.

She studied theater at the Fernando González Mardones Theater Club Academy. She began her television career on the TV series Playa Salvaje and later other successful telenovelas such as Marparaíso, Cerro Alegre, and the all time audience record Amores de mercado. The last telenovelas in which she participated were La sexóloga and Bim Bam Bum.

She also has participated in four feature films, most notably a supporting role in Pablo Larraín's critically acclaimed The Club (2015).

Since 2001 she has also worked as a TV presenter. In 2004 she was the host of the Chilean adaptation of The Weakest Link produced by Channel 13. From 2016 to 2019 she hosted the program Intrusos en La Red, where she got fired after a controversy involving a physical aggression against Carabineros de Chile for being fined for not fastening the seat belt while driving. 

In 2008, she performed the monologue "Being famous is a chub" for the Chilevisión program El club de la comedia. 

After her departure from television, she has participated with Patricia Maldonado in the online program "Las Indomables".

In 2020, she announced her candidacy for councilor of Las Condes for the right Chilean Republican Party. She was not elected.

Filmography

Films
Santos (2005)
Drama (2010)
Maknum González (2013)
The Club (2015)

Telenovelas

Television conduction

References 

1974 births
Living people
People from Santiago
Chilean television actresses
Chilean television presenters
Chilean women television presenters
Chilean film actresses
Chilean female models
Actresses from Santiago
20th-century Chilean actresses
21st-century Chilean actresses
Chilean politicians
Chilean anti-communists
Republican Party (Chile, 2019) politicians